

1990 

* Cup awarded to Nigeria as Senegal refused to take part in penalty shootout

1991

1992

1993

1994

1995

1996

1997

1998 

Nigeria played the non-FIFA Catalonia team on 22 December 1998; this did not contribute to ranking points or individual cap totals.

1999 
Nigeria played the non-FIFA Basque Country team on 29 December 1999; this did not contribute to ranking points or individual cap totals.

Notes

References

External links
 Nigeria: Fixtures and Results – FIFA.com
 Nigeria national football team complete 'A' international record – 11v11.com
 World's Largest Referee Database – WorldReferee.com

1990s in Nigeria
1990-1999
1990–91 in Nigerian football
1991–92 in Nigerian football
1992–93 in Nigerian football
1993–94 in Nigerian football
1994–95 in Nigerian football
1995–96 in Nigerian football
1996–97 in Nigerian football
1997–98 in Nigerian football
1998–99 in Nigerian football
1999–2000 in Nigerian football